Alani Fua (born January 1, 1992) is a former American football linebacker. He was signed by the Arizona Cardinals as an undrafted rookie free agent following the 2015 NFL Draft. He played college football at Brigham Young from 2010 to 2014.

Professional career

Arizona Cardinals
Fua was signed by the Arizona Cardinals as an undrafted free agent on May 2, 2015.

On September 28, 2016, Fua was placed on injured reserve with a knee injury.

On July 31, 2017, Fua was waived/injured by the Cardinals and placed on injured reserve. He was released on September 18, 2017.

Personal life
Alani Fua is of Tongan descent, the son of George and Helen Fua. His older brother, Sione Fua, is currently a free agent.

His father, George Fua, of San Mateo, played tight end for Ricks College, San Joaquin Delta College, and Cal State Northridge in the late 1980s and early 1990s. He went undrafted in the 1991 NFL Draft and briefly played professional football in the Arena Football League, with the Sacramento Attack and Miami Hooters. He now operates a construction company in Northridge, California.

He is married to Malaysia Fua [née Gonzalez]. Together they have 2 boys, and a little girl on the way.

References

External links
BYU Cougars Bio
Arizona Cardinals Bio

Living people
American football linebackers
American people of Tongan descent
Players of American football from California
BYU Cougars football players
Arizona Cardinals players
People from San Fernando, California
Sportspeople from Los Angeles County, California
1992 births